State Highway 16 (SH-16) in Idaho is a  route, connecting Emmett with US-20/US-26 and Star.

Route description
Also known as the Central Valley Expressway and the Emmett Highway, Highway 16 begins at the junction of US-20/US-26. It meets at a junction with State Highway 44, with Star to the West, and Eagle to the East. The highway continues north through Jackass Gulch and descends over 500 vertical feet (150 m) on the Freezeout Grade into the Emmett Valley. The highway then curves westward for a short distance, where it terminates at the junction with State Highway 52 just south of the Emmett city limits.

History
This route has been in existence since 1929. The original alignment terminated in Horseshoe Bend. In 1938, the northern section of the alignment from Emmett to Horseshoe Bend was then replaced by State Highway 52. When this happened, the highway then realigned to the west, terminating in Payette. The route was truncated at its current terminus in Emmett in 1955 when Highway 52 was extended on to its northern section heading toward New Plymouth.

While campaigning for a return to Congress in 1934, Robert McCracken died in an automobile accident on the highway in May, near Emmett. His vehicle went through a guard rail and tumbled down Freezeout Hill.

Firebird Raceway opened  in 1968 on the west side of the highway, between Star and Emmett.

In December 2012, construction began on the 2.1-mile Boise River Bridge section between SH-44 and US-20/26. This was the first phase of a long-range plan to extend the highway south to Interstate 84. This 4-lane divided limited-access expressway opened to traffic on August 15, 2014.

Future
Plans are underway to extend SH-16 south of its current terminus to Interstate 84. The new highway is planned to be a 4-lane divided limited-access expressway or freeway. This project is part of the ITD GARVEE Transportation Program as well as the Transportation Expansion and Congestion Mitigation (TECM) program. The extension includes interchanges at Franklin Road, Ustick Road, Chinden Boulevard (US-20/US-26), and State Street (SH-44), as well as a new system interchange with I-84. The project is being constructed in phases, with phase 2 currently under construction and phase 3 in the final design phase.

ITD is planning to conduct an environmental study on SH-16 from Emmett to SH-44 to look at potential expansion and improvements to the highway. The study was originally planned for 2026, but 2 serious car crashes on the highway combined with the high amount of development in the area have accelerated the start date of the study.

Major intersections

See also

 List of state highways in Idaho
 List of highways numbered 16

References

External links

016
Transportation in Ada County, Idaho
Transportation in Gem County, Idaho